1940 Olympics refers to both:

 The 1940 Winter Olympics, which were originally to be held in Sapporo, Japan before being relocated to Garmisch-Partenkirchen, Germany, but were cancelled due to World War II
 The 1940 Summer Olympics, which were originally to be held in Tokyo, Japan before being relocated to Helsinki, Finland, but were cancelled due to World War II
 The 1940 Olympics took place in 1940, in the summer.